Frutigen-Niedersimmental District in the Canton of Bern was created on 1 January 2010. It is part of the Oberland administrative region.

References

Districts of the canton of Bern